Hans-Joachim Tiedge (June 24, 1937 in Berlin – April 6, 2011 near Moscow) was a head of West Germany's counter-intelligence in the Office for the Protection of the Constitution (BfV) in Cologne. He was revealed to be an East German spy when he defected to the East on August 19, 1985. He had been recruited by Markus Wolf.

History
In the four years prior to his defection, he was responsible for tracking down East German spies, but with little success.  In the same period, the East Germans captured 168 West German spies. He was thought to have defected for personal reasons, as he had not, apparently, been discovered. His treachery was called the most damaging of the Cold War for the Federal Republic of Germany, resulting in the recall of numerous West German agents still in the field and plunging the West German counterespionage service into ruins.

Questions were raised as to how Tiedge managed to hold on to his position despite serious debts, family issues and a drinking problem. It was suspected that his superior, Herbert Hellenbroich may have assisted him to hold his position. Hellenbroich resigned within weeks of the defection.

After German reunification Tiedge fled to Moscow where he lived under the name "Hans Ottowitsch".

Death
Hans died on April 6, 2011.

Tiedge's defection was mentioned in the Phoenix Force novel The Doomsday Syndrome in 1986.

Notes

1937 births
2011 deaths
Cold War BfV chiefs
Russian and Soviet-German people
West German defectors to East Germany
West German spies for East Germany
German defectors to the Soviet Union
People granted political asylum in the Soviet Union